The Javan fulvetta (Alcippe pyrrhoptera) is a species of bird in the family Alcippeidae. It is endemic to Indonesia.

Its natural habitat is subtropical or tropical moist montane forest.

References

Collar, N. J. & Robson C. 2007. Family Timaliidae (Babblers)  pp. 70 – 291 in; del Hoyo, J., Elliott, A. & Christie, D.A. eds. Handbook of the Birds of the World, Vol. 12. Picathartes to Tits and Chickadees. Lynx Edicions, Barcelona.

Javan fulvetta
Birds of Java
Javan fulvetta
Javan fulvetta
Taxonomy articles created by Polbot